KSSY-LP was a low-power television station in Arroyo Grande, California, broadcasting locally on channel 20. Founded February 28, 1990, the station was owned by Iglesia Jesuchristo Es Mi Refugio, Inc.

Originally owned by Erwin Scala and known as K66CY broadcasting on channel 66, the station initially went with an approach to broadcast family-friendly programming. In 2004, KSSY was leased to OBN Holdings and broadcast Omni Broadcasting Network programs.

Later it would become affiliated with Urban America Television, America One, Bloomberg Television, and Classic Arts Showcase. The station then signed off until the summer of 2007, when Scala sold the station to Hispanic Christian Community Network. On November 6, 2007, Hispanic Christian Community Network, Inc. assigned the license of KSSY-LP to Iglesia Jesuchristo Es Mi Refugio, Inc., a non-profit religious organization based in Dallas, Texas.

On August 6, 2010, the Federal Communications Commission (FCC) cancelled the station's license and deleted the KSSY-LP call sign from its database.

References

External links 

Now-defunct website for KSSY

Arroyo Grande, California
Television channels and stations established in 1990
Defunct television stations in the United States
Television channels and stations disestablished in 2010
1990 establishments in California
2010 disestablishments in California
SSY-LP
SSY-LP